Qızıl Qışlaq, Fuzuli
 Qızıl Qışlaq, Shahbuz